Dave Barr (born April 12, 1952 in Los Angeles, California) is an American veteran of the Vietnam War and a motorcyclist best known for being the first double amputee to circumnavigate the globe.  He lives in Bodfish, California where he runs a motorcycle tour company. He is also the author of several books and was inducted into the Motorcycle Hall of Fame in 2000.

Military service
Barr joined the US Marine Corps when he was 17 and served in Vietnam on a helicopter gunship. After his discharge from the Marines in 1972 he lived in various locations around the world and served in the armed forces of several countries, including: two years with the Israeli Parachute Regiment and one year Rhodesian Light Infantry. He was in the middle of two years of service as an enlisted army paratrooper with the South African Defence Force, when he was injured in a land-mine explosion in Angola in 1981. In 1981 while riding in a military vehicle in southern Angola, his vehicle drove over a land mine and the resulting explosion cost him both of his legs, above the knee on the right and below the knee on the left. Prosthetic legs allowed him to complete his tour of duty.

Motorcyclist
In 1994 Barr set a world record for riding a Harley-Davidson 83,000 miles around the world, including a 13,000 mile Atlantic to Pacific segment across Northern Europe and Siberia. The bike that Barr used for the journey is currently on display at the AMA Motorcycle Hall of Fame in Pickerington, Ohio.

Barr also set a second world record for riding the so-called Southern Cross. In just 45 days during 1996, he completed the first motorcycle journey ever between the four extreme geographical corners of the Australian continent. Barr was inducted into the Motorcycle Hall of Fame in 2000 not only for his world record setting exploits, but also for the charity work he has done for the disabled along the way.

Writing
Barr wrote a travelogue, Riding the Edge, in 1995.

References

External links
 davebarr1972.com davebarr1972.com/patriot-express

1953 births
Living people
United States Marine Corps personnel of the Vietnam War
Foreign volunteers in the Rhodesian Security Forces
People from Los Angeles
People of the South African Border War
Long-distance motorcycle riders
South African Army personnel
American expatriates in Rhodesia
American expatriates in South Africa
World record holders